This article refers to the Sports broadcasting contracts in Finland. For a list of other country's broadcasting rights, see Sports television broadcast contracts.

In Finland Certain sporting events must be broadcast in a way that a significant portion of the public can view them without paying. These events include the Olympic Games, FIFA World Cup, UEFA European Championship, Ice Hockey World Championships, FIS Nordic World Ski Championships, World Athletics Championships and European Athletics Championships.

Football 
FIFA World Cup: Shared between YLE and MTV Oy until 2026.
UEFA European Championship: Yle
UEFA Champions League: C More until 2023-24
UEFA Europa League: Viaplay until 2023-24
UEFA Europa Conference League: Viaplay until 2023-24
UEFA Super Cup: C More until 2023
Veikkausliiga: IS Extra, Ruutu+, Nelonen, Jim
Premier League: Viaplay until 2027-28
La Liga: C More
Serie A: C More until 2023-24
Eredivisie: Viaplay until 2023-24

Fight Sports 
Bushido MMA: DAZN: October 2022 to October 2025, all fights
CAGE MMA Finland: Viaplay
Dream Boxing: DAZN: October 2022 to October 2025, all fights
Golden Boy: DAZN
King of Kings: DAZN: October 2022 to October 2025, all fights
KSW: Viaplay
Matchroom: DAZN
UFC: Viaplay

Handball 

 World Men's Handball Championship: Viaplay until 2031
 World Women's Handball Championship: Viaplay until 2031

Motor racing
MotoGP: Discovery+
Formula One: V Sport and Viaplay

References

Finland
Television in Finland